Arthur James Robertson (25 May 1916 – 2 July 1991) was an Australian rules footballer who played for the St Kilda Football Club in the Victorian Football League (VFL).

He later served in the Royal Australian Air Force during World War II.

Notes

External links 

1916 births
1991 deaths
Australian rules footballers from Melbourne
St Kilda Football Club players
Royal Australian Air Force personnel of World War II
People from Murrumbeena, Victoria
Military personnel from Melbourne